Enrique Peris de Vargas (27 February 1887 - 17 February 1953) was a Spanish footballer who played as a left winger. He spent most of his career at Barcelona, with whom he played over 300 matches. He won three Copa del Reys and five Catalan Championships. He played numerous times with the Catalan national team. As an athlete, he stood out in the 100m dash and the long jump. He also worked as a referee.

Club career
Born in Barcelona, he began his career in 1903 at FC Internacional. Together with Paco Bru and Charles Wallace, he helped the club achieve three successive runner-up finishes in the Catalan championship between 1904 and 1906, losing out on the title to a different opponent each time, Club Español (now RCD Espanyol) FC Barcelona and X Sporting Club respectively. In 1906, the club had to suspend its activities due to a lack of players, and most of the players, including him, joined Barcelona in the 1906-07 season, playing first as a midfielder and finally as a left-winger.

He played for Barça for more than a decade, becoming the first player to reach 200 official matches with the club. In total, he played 308 matches and scored 34 goals. Peris was an integral piece in Barcelona's first great team, which had the likes of Alfredo Massana, Manuel Amechazurra and Pepe Rodríguez, as well as fellow FC Internacional teammates Bru and Wallace. Together with them, he helped the club win 5 Catalan championships including three successive titles between 1909 and 1911, along with four back-to-back Pyrenees Cups between 1910 and 1913, and three Copa del Rey titles in 1910, 1912 and 1913. In the latter's final, Barça needed three games to beat Real Sociedad and Peris started in all of them.

International career
Like many other FC Barcelona players at the time, Peris was summoned by the Catalonia national team for 10 games, one of which was the team's first-ever game recognized by FIFA on 20 February 1912, which ended in a 0-7 loss to France. A few days earlier, on 11 February, he had been one of the eleven players that had faced a weaker side of France, helping Catalonia to a 2-0 win. He also represented the Catalan team in the first edition of the Prince of Asturias Cup in 1915, an inter-regional competition organized by the RFEF.

Refereeing career
Peris began his refereeing career shortly after he retired in 1917, thus joining the Board of the College of Referees of the Center, the first College of Referees in Spain. As a referee, he oversaw matches of the Central Championship, and even of the Copa del Rey. In total, he oversaw more than 50 games.

Together with Eulogio Aranguren and Ezequiel Montero, he holds the peculiar distinction of having participated in the Prince of Asturias Cup as both a player and referee, given that Peris played in the 1915 edition and then refereed one match in the competition, a quarter-final between Valencia and Andalusia in the 1922–23 edition, ending in a 2-1 win to the Andalusians.

Honours

Club
Barcelona
Catalan championship:
Champions (5): 1908–09, 1909–10, 1910–11, 1912–13, 1915–16
Pyrenees Cup:
Champions (4): 1910, 1911, 1912 and 1913
Copa del Rey:
Champions (3): 1910, 1912 and 1913

International
Catalonia
Prince of Asturias Cup:
Runner-up (1): 1915

References

1887 births
1953 deaths
Footballers from Barcelona
Spanish footballers
Association football wingers
FC Barcelona players
Catalonia international footballers